Again and Again and Again and Again is the debut EP by American indie pop duo the Bird and the Bee. It was released on October 31, 2006, by Blue Note Records, three months before the duo's first full-length album, The Bird and the Bee. The EP contributed three tracks to the album. Exclusive to the EP is a remix of the duo's first single, "Fucking Boyfriend," by Canadian electronic musician Peaches.

Track listing

Personnel
Credits for Again and Again and Again and Again adapted from EP liner notes.

The Bird and the Bee
 Greg Kurstin – engineer, instrumentation, mixing, producer
 Inara George – vocals (all tracks); fuzz bass (1)

Additional personnel
 Peaches – mixing, remix producer
 Autumn de Wilde – photography
 Josh Gold – project manager
 Gordon H. Jee – creative director
 Gavin Lurssen – mastering
 David McEowen – mastering
 David Ralicke – horn (2)
 Helen Verhoeven – cover painting
 Burton Yount – art direction, design

In Popular Culture
The title track is sampled by Mac Miller on the song "Lucky Ass Bitch" featuring Juicy J off of his 2012 mixtape, Macadelic.

References

External links
 

2006 debut EPs
Albums produced by Greg Kurstin
The Bird and the Bee albums
Blue Note Records EPs